Haßmersheim is a municipality in the district of Neckar-Odenwald-Kreis, in Baden-Württemberg, Germany.

Administration

Haßmersheim consists of three subdivisions:
 Haßmersheim, population 3649
 Hochhausen, population 730
 Neckarmühlbach, population 532

References
 Official Web site

Neckar-Odenwald-Kreis
Populated places on the Neckar basin
Populated riverside places in Germany